Camlachie is an area of the city of Glasgow in Scotland, located in the East End of the city, between Dennistoun to the north, and Bridgeton to the south. Formerly a weaving village on the Camlachie Burn, it then developed as an important industrial suburb from the late 19th century, only to almost entirely disappear from the landscape when those industries declined a century later.

It gave its name to the former constituency of the United Kingdom Parliament, Glasgow Camlachie which existed between 1885 and 1955.

In the 21st century, much of the historic Camlachie territory is occupied by the Forge Retail Park (part of The Forge Shopping Centre complex which stretches west from its main site at Parkhead and was built on the site of the William Beardmore and Company steel forge, the area's major employer until its closure in 1983). Other streets which were traditionally part of Camlachie have become more associated with the Barrowfield and Gallowgate neighbourhoods following several redevelopments which caused the loss of most of the older buildings in the area and consequently its integrity as a defined district of the city.

Notable people

William Nixon, Moderator of the General Assembly of the Free Church of Scotland 1868/69

External links
Camlachie at Gazetteer for Scotland
Camlachie during the Industrial Revolution at The Glasgow Story
Camlachie, the forgotten village at Parkhead History

Areas of Glasgow
Parkhead
History of Glasgow